East Samos ( Anatoliki Samos) is a municipality on the island of Samos in the North Aegean region in Greece. The municipality was formed at the 2019 local government reform, when the pre-existing municipality of Samos was divided in two. Its seat is the town Samos.

The municipality consists of the following two subdivisions (municipal units):
Pythagoreio
Vathy

References 

Populated places in Samos
2019 establishments in Greece
Municipalities of the North Aegean